Czarnocin may refer to the following places:
Czarnocin, Łódź Voivodeship (central Poland)
Czarnocin, Podlaskie Voivodeship (north-east Poland)
Czarnocin, Świętokrzyskie Voivodeship (south-central Poland)
Czarnocin, Białobrzegi County in Masovian Voivodeship (east-central Poland)
Czarnocin, Mińsk County in Masovian Voivodeship (east-central Poland)
Czarnocin, Mława County in Masovian Voivodeship (east-central Poland)
Czarnocin, Opole Voivodeship (south-west Poland)
Czarnocin, Pomeranian Voivodeship (north Poland)
Czarnocin, West Pomeranian Voivodeship (north-west Poland)